The women's marathon event at the 2007 World Championships in Athletics took place on 2 September 2007 in the streets of Osaka, Japan.

Medallists

Abbreviations
All times shown are in hours:minutes:seconds

Records

Results

Team

See also
 2007 World Marathon Cup

References

External links
Full results – IAAF.org
Event report – IAAF.org

Marathon
Marathons at the World Athletics Championships
World Championships
Women's marathons
2007 in women's athletics
Marathons in Japan